NH 38 may refer to:
 National Highway 38 (India)
 New Hampshire Route 38 (U.S.)